Hermann/Herman  Nunberg (23 January 1884 - 20 May 1970) was a psychoanalyst and neurologist born in Będzin which was then part of the German Empire.

Training and life

Nunberg earned his medical degree in 1910 from the University of Zurich, where he assisted Carl Gustav Jung at the Burghölzli Psychiatric Clinic with word association tests.  For a short time he practised psychiatry in Schaffhausen and Bern, and in 1912 he taught classes at the university clinic in Krakow. In 1914 he became an assistant to Julius Wagner-Jauregg in Vienna, where for several years he taught classes on neurology, and where in 1915 he joined the Vienna Psychoanalytic Society. 

He remained in Vienna until 1932 when he emigrated to the United States and worked in Philadelphia and New York City. While in New York he was a member of the New York Psychoanalytic Society, of which he was president from 1950 until 1952.

Writings and work

In 1932 copies of his lectures were published (translated in 1955 as a book titled "Principles of Psychoanalysis, Their Application to the Neuroses"); and in the preface of the 1932 publication, an impressed Sigmund Freud wrote that it:"contains the most complete and conscientious presentation of a psycho-analytic theory of the neurotic processes which we at present possess".

Nunberg was an early advocate (1918) of required "training analysis" sessions for psychoanalysts in training. He also spoke up strongly in favor of lay analysis, suggesting that behind opposition to it stood non-theoretical motives “such as medical prestige and motives of an economic nature”.

Ernest Jones noted Nunberg as one of the few proponents for Freud’s Death drive.  Jacques Lacan however considered that Nunberg revealed something of his own grandiosity in his meditations upon the relations between the life and the death forces.

Nunberg’s articles on ‘The Will to Recovery’ (1926) and ‘On the Theory of Therapeutic Results of Psychoanalysis’ (1937) reveal his interest in the curative aspects of analysis.  Lacan singled out the former piece as showing (in humorous fashion) the inherent ambiguities in the neurotic’s search for cure: “to restore peace in his home...the patient admits to a desire, in the form of a temporary suspension of his presence at home, the opposite of what he came to propose as the first aim of his analysis”.

See also
Apprentice complex
Depersonalization
Franz Alexander

Bibliography

References

External links 
 Answers.com; Hermann Nunberg

1884 births
1970 deaths
Austrian psychiatrists
Analysands of Paul Federn
German expatriates in Switzerland
German emigrants to Austria-Hungary
Austrian emigrants to the United States